Collin is one of the ten district electoral areas (DEA) in Belfast, Northern Ireland. The district elects six members to Belfast City Council and contains the wards of Dunmurry; Ladybrook; Lagmore; Poleglass; Twinbrook and Stewartstown. Collin, along with neighbouring Black Mountain and most of the Court District Electoral Area, forms the greater part of the Belfast West constituencies for the Northern Ireland Assembly and UK Parliament.

The DEA was created for the 2014 local elections, combining parts of the Upper Falls District Electoral Area, which had existed since 1985, with parts of the abolished Lisburn City Council.

Councillors

2019 results
2014: 5 x Sinn Féin, 1 x SDLP

2019: 4 x Sinn Féin, 1 x SDLP, 1 x People Before Profit

2014-2019 Change: People Before Profit gain from Sinn

2014 Results 
2014: 5 x Sinn Féin, 1 x SDLP

References

Electoral wards of Belfast
2014 establishments in Northern Ireland